Claire Ortiz Hill (born 1951) is an independent scholar, a religious hermit and author of books and articles on the Austro-German roots of twentieth century philosophy, specializing in the works of Edmund Husserl, the foundations of analytic philosophy,  the philosophy of logic, and the philosophy of mathematics. She has American  and French nationalities.  Claire Ortiz Hill is a nom de plume. She was born Claire Retta Marie Hill.

Life and education
Hill was born in Santa Fe, New Mexico, where her ancestors have lived since the 17th century. Her mother, Adelina Ortiz de Hill (1929–2014) was an artist, a social worker with a specialty in gerontology, fiesta princess and rodeo queen,  author, and local historian, named as a "Santa Fe Living Treasure" in 2011. At the end of his career her father, Milford Hill (1925-1977), was a Regional Administrator for the Department of Rehabilitation of the State of California.

Hill graduated from Redlands High School in Redlands, California in 1968. She earned a bachelor's degree, with a Senior Honor's Thesis on Descartes and Husserl in December 1970 and a master's degree, with a specialty in twentieth century French philosophy and literature from the University of California, Riverside in 1974. From 1974-1976 she taught Philosophy and English in the California Community College system. She earned a second master's degree, with a thesis entitled La Logique des expressions intentionnelles in 1979  and a doctorate, with a thesis entitled Le Mot et la Chose chez Husserl et Frege in 1987 from Paris-Sorbonne University (Paris-IV). Professor Maurice Clavelin directed both theses. She studied German in Leipzig in 1989, Halle in 1985, Erfurt in 1987 and Magdeburg in 1994 and Spanish in Guadalajara, Mexico in 1969.

She has been a religious hermit with private vows since October 4, 1981. She has been affiliated with the Roman Catholic Archdiocese of Paris since the early 1980s. Prior to that she was a church social worker at the Shrine of the Sacred Heart in Washington D.C.

Books
Hill's books include:
Word and Object in Husserl, Frege, and Russell: The Roots of Twentieth-Century Philosophy (Ohio University Press, 1991)
Rethinking Identity and Metaphysics: On the Foundations of Analytic Philosophy (Yale University Press, 1997)
Husserl or Frege?: Meaning, Objectivity, and Mathematics (with Guillermo E. Rosado Haddock, Open Court, 2000)
The Roots and Flowers of Evil in Baudelaire, Nietzsche and Hitler (Open Court, 2006)
Facing the Light: Ten Mystical Stories (with Jacqueline Wegmann, Lone Butte Press, 2010)
The Road Not Taken, On Husserl's Philosophy of Logic and Mathematics (with Jairo José da Silva, College Publications, 2013)

She is also the translator from German into English of Husserl's Introduction to Logic and Theory of Knowledge: Lectures 1906/07 (Springer, 2008) and Logic and General Theory of Science (Springer, 2019), and the translator from English into French of Anna-Teresa Tymieniecka's The Fullness of the Logos in the Key of Life (as La Plénitude du Logos dans le registre de la vie, L'Harmattan, 2011). She has published over fifty articles in her field. A complete, up-to-date list of her publications is found on her website: https://ranchodepancho.pagesperso-orange.fr/Writings.htm

References

External links
Home page

1951 births
Living people
American philosophers
American women philosophers
French philosophers
French women philosophers
Analytic philosophers
University of California, Riverside alumni
Paris-Sorbonne University alumni
German–English translators
English–French translators
American hermits
French hermits
21st-century American women